Sheila Cherfilus-McCormick (born January 25, 1979) is an American businesswoman and politician serving as the U.S representative for Florida's 20th congressional district. A member of the Democratic Party, she won a special election in 2022 to fill the seat left vacant after the death of Alcee Hastings.

Early life and career 
Cherfilus-McCormick was born in the Brooklyn borough of New York City, to parents from Haiti and raised in the borough of Queens. She moved to Florida at 13 to attend high school. She earned a Bachelor of Arts degree in political science and government from Howard University and a Juris Doctor from the St. Thomas University School of Law.

After graduating from college, Cherfilus-McCormick served as a project manager for the New York City Transit Authority. From 1999 to 2007, she worked as the vice president for operations of Trinity Health Care Services, a Florida-based family home health care company co-founded by her stepfather, Gabriel Smith. She later served as CEO.

U.S. House of Representatives

Elections

2018
Cherfilus-McCormick ran for Florida's 20th congressional district in the August 28 Democratic primary against incumbent Alcee Hastings in 2018. She lost, 73.6%–26.4%.

2020
Cherfilus-McCormick challenged Hastings again in 2020. She noted various ethics concerns facing Hastings and his health as reasons for running. She lost the August 18 primary, 69.3%–30.7%.

2022 special

After Hastings died on April 6, 2021, Cherfilus-McCormick ran again in the 20th district in the 2022 special election. During the campaign, she loaned $3.7 million to her campaign organization. She campaigned on progressive policies such as a Green New Deal, Medicare for All, and a $1,000-a-month universal basic income. Her campaign was supported by Brand New Congress, a progressive organization that also backed candidates such as Alexandria Ocasio-Cortez and Rashida Tlaib.

After a recount, Cherfilus-McCormick was declared the winner of the Democratic primary by five votes over Broward County commissioner Dale Holness. She easily defeated Republican Jason Mariner in the January 11, 2022, general election. She is the only Haitian-American Democrat ever elected to Congress and only the second overall, after Republican Mia Love of Utah.

2022 regular election

Cherfilus-McCormick defeated Republican nominee Drew Montez-Clark with 72% of the vote.

Committee assignments 
Committee on Education and Labor
Committee on Veterans' Affairs
Subcommittee on Technology Modernization (ranking member)
Committee on Transportation and Infrastructure
Committee on Foreign Affairs

Caucus memberships 
Congressional Black Caucus
Congressional Progressive Caucus
Congressional LGBTQ+ Equality Caucus

Personal life 
Cherfilus-McCormick married lawyer Corlie McCormick in 2017 and lives in Miramar, Florida.

Cherfilus-McCormick is Protestant.

Electoral history

2018

2020

2022 (special)

2022

See also 
 List of African-American United States representatives
 Women in the United States House of Representatives

References

External links 
 
Representative Cherfilus-McCormick official U.S. House website
Campaign website

|-

1979 births
21st-century African-American politicians
21st-century American businesswomen
21st-century American businesspeople
21st-century American politicians
21st-century American women lawyers
21st-century American lawyers
21st-century American women politicians
African-American members of the United States House of Representatives
African-American women in business
African-American women in politics
African-American women lawyers
African-American lawyers
American Protestants
African-American Christians
American politicians of Haitian descent
Businesspeople from Florida
Chaminade-Madonna College Preparatory School alumni
Christians from Florida
Democratic Party members of the United States House of Representatives from Florida
Female members of the United States House of Representatives
Florida lawyers
Howard University alumni
Living people
People from Miramar, Florida
Protestants from Florida
St. Thomas University (Florida) alumni